Elena Maróthy-Šoltésová (6 January 1855 – 11 February 1939) was a Slovak writer and editor. She was also a leading figure in the women's movement in Slovakia.

The daughter of Reverend Daniel Maróthy and Karolina Hudecová, she was born in Krupina and was educated in Lučenec. Her mother died while she was still young. She became a member of the committee for the Živena women's society  in 1880 and served as its chair from 1894 to 1927. From 1912 to 1922, she was editor of the Živena magazine, which she helped found.  Maróthy-Šoltésová also helped establish higher education for women in her country. including the Milan Rastislav Štefánik Institute.

In 1875, she married Ľudovít Michal Šoltés, a merchant; the couple had two children, but her daughter died at the age of eight and her son when he was 33.

She died in Martin at the age of 84.

Selected works 
 Proti prúdu (Against the Current), novel (1894)
 Moje deti (My Children), diary (1923–24)
 Sedemdesiat rokov života (Seventy Years of Life), memoirs (1925)
 Pohľady na literatúru (Perspectives on Literature), essays (1958)

References

External links 
 Šesťdesiatročná pamiatka Živeny, spolku slovenských žien. Turč. Sv. Martin: Knihtlač. uč. spolok, 1929. 15 p. - available at ULB's Digital Library

1855 births
1939 deaths
Slovak feminists
Slovak novelists
Slovak journalists
Slovak Lutherans
19th-century Slovak women writers
19th-century Slovak writers
People from Krupina
Burials at National Cemetery in Martin
20th-century Slovak women writers
20th-century Slovak writers
Slovak women novelists
Slovak women journalists